Kowreh is a City in Bidshahr district, Evaz County, Fars Province, Iran. At the 2020 census, its population was 4,900, in 722 families.

Kowreh is an ancient village whose age ranges between 2500 to 3000 years. It is distinguished by its ancient castle and cemetery (Mirmansur), which is up to 950 years old, and the Sheikh Mubarak Mosque, whose foot reaches the date of 780 AH, as well as the factory (Bazai bricks) Shah Reis Allanqani (the bricks are bricks  Of clay, which they burn in factories or kilns), wheels in the mountains and historical graves, and from the ruins of Kowreh also the castle of Kaldo and an old tower that dates back to it before Islam.  Iron melting place, ceramic kiln. Many of the people of Kowreh have migrated to Harang and Al-Banader areas in search of safety and stability from some problems in their area. The most important Kowreh peoples are: Rais, Mulla, Qaid, Mirshkar.

References 

Populated places in Evaz County